Yaakov Bar-Or (Hebrew: יעקב בר-אור) was born as Jacob Breuer to Jenny and Isaac Breuer in 1916. He studied law in Germany and became a successful attorney. Later, he moved to Israel and assumed the surname "Bar-Or". He dropped the name change later in life. 

Breuer came to Israel in the 1930s and became a lawyer in 1943.  In 1959, he was appointed District Attorney General in Tel Aviv. That same year he was appointed Israeli delegate to the United Nations and sat on the committee for human rights. In 1961 Breuer was assistant prosecutor in the trial of Adolf Eichmann. This was the only execution and execution trial in the history of the state of Israel.

He died in 2008 in Jerusalem at the age of 92.

References
Eichmann in Jerusalem: A Report on the Banality of Evil by Hannah Arendt (1996) Penguin Classics
nizkor.org

Jewish emigrants from Nazi Germany to Mandatory Palestine
1916 births
2008 deaths
20th-century Israeli judges
Adolf Eichmann